"Te Robaré" is a song by American singer Nicky Jam and Puerto Rican singer Ozuna, released as a single by Sony Music Latin on March 22, 2019. The track was written by the two singers, Juan Diego Medina, Johnatan Ballesteros, Vicente Saavedra, Nino Segarra, and its producers Gaby Music and Chris Jeday. It is the second single off Nicky Jam's fifth studio album Íntimo.

Chart performance 
"Te Robaré" reached number one on the US Billboard Latin Airplay chart dated July 27, 2019, earning Nicky Jam and Ozuna their 10th and 11th number one's, respectively.

Music video 
The video, directed by Jessy Terrero, shows various women dancing and posing in front of various settings, such as phone booths and cars, while Nicky Jam and Ozuna are performing. The music video has over 500 million views on YouTube as of January 2020.

Charts

Weekly charts

Year-end charts

Certifications

See also
 List of Billboard Argentina Hot 100 top-ten singles in 2019
List of Billboard number-one Latin songs of 2019

References

2019 singles
2019 songs
Nicky Jam songs
Ozuna (singer) songs
Spanish-language songs
Songs written by Ozuna (singer)
Songs written by Nicky Jam
Songs written by Chris Jedi
Music videos directed by Jessy Terrero